The article lists the works of the 19th-century Slovene writer, poet and playwright Fran Levstik.

Prose 
 Martin Krpan from Vrh
 A Journey from Litija to Čatež
 The Tenth Brother (unfinished and unpublished at the time.
 The Fascicle
 From the Past Happy Youth
 Memories about the Faiths and Thoughts of a Free Nation
 Pokljuk
 Saint Doctor Bežanec in Tožbanja Vas
 Who Made Videk's Shirt

Poetry

Poem collections
Poems (1854)
 Tona's Poems (1859)
 Franja's Poems (1870)

Narrative poems
The Fugitive King
The Prince's Son
A Flower
In the Upper Carniola
A Girl and a Bird

Reflective poems
 Homesickness
 A Reminder to Joy
 Spring
 Omnia evanescunt
 The Artist
 Literary Wisdom
 Despair
 Struggle
 Our Misery

Satirical poems
 The Dreams of the Parish Priest
 To the Saint Elijah
 The Slovene Literature
 In the Memory of the Deceased Forward
 The People's Voice
 Let's Keep Silent!
 To the Enemies
 A Novel

Children's Poems
 Our Village
 A Living Flower
 When a Child Chases the Moon and the Stars
 The Milky Way
 A Prayer of a Simple Child
 How is it in the Carantania
 A Hedgehog and a Fox
 A Cat, a Mouse, and a Little Mouse

Dramatics 
 Juntez (1855)
 Tugomer (1876)

References

External links